The St. Mary Assumpta Cathedral  also called Tanjung Selor Cathedral, Is a Catholic Church located in the city of Tanjung Selor, a district in the regency of Bulungan in the province of Kalimantan of the North to the northeast of the island of Borneo in Indonesia.

The building of the church was blessed by the representative of the Holy See, the Apostolic Nuncio, Monsignor Antonio Guido Filipazzi on February 5, 2012. Although the creation of the parish dates from 1996.

The cathedral dedicated to the Assumption of the Virgin Mary to the Heaven follows the Roman or Latin rite and is the most important church of the Diocese of Tanjung Selor (Dioecesis Tanjungselorensis or Keuskupan Tanjung Selor) that was created in 2001 through the bull "Ad aptius Consulendum "of Pope John Paul II.

At the moment it is sede vacante, reason why it does not have responsible bishop.

See also
List of cathedrals in Indonesia
Roman Catholicism in Indonesia
St. Mary Assumpta

References

Roman Catholic cathedrals in Indonesia
Roman Catholic churches completed in 2012
Churches in Borneo
21st-century Roman Catholic church buildings